Journal of Popular Film and Television is a quarterly peer-reviewed academic journal published by Routledge, which purchased it from Heldref Publications in 2009. Michael Marsden, who was the dean of the College of Arts & Sciences at Northern Michigan University in the late 1990s, co-founded the journal. The journal was established in 1971, with the first issue in 1972 and until 1978 was titled Journal of Popular Film. The journal is devoted to publishing criticism that "examines commercial film and television from a sociocultural perspective."

Abstracting and indexing 
The journal is abstracted and indexed by Current Contents/Arts & Humanities, EBSCOhost, MLA International Bibliography, Scopus, and the Arts & Humanities Citation Index.

See also

 List of film periodicals

References

External links
 

English-language journals
Media studies journals
Publications established in 1972
Quarterly journals
Taylor & Francis academic journals